Michela Vittoria Brambilla (born 26 October 1967) is an Italian politician, animal rights activist and businesswoman. On 12 May 2008 she was nominated undersecretary (Tourism) in the Berlusconi IV Cabinet; on 8 May 2009 she was appointed Minister of Culture and Tourism, a position held until 2011. In 2007 she set up The People of Freedom, the goal of which was to merge the right-wing allies of Berlusconi. She is a current leader of the Animalist Movement.

Biography 

Heir of a family of steel manufacturers going back four generations, Brambilla received a degree in philosophy from the Università Cattolica del Sacro Cuore. In 2006 she lost an election for the Chamber of Deputies, on the Forza Italia ticket. In 2007 she named herself president of the national association of the Club of Freedom, the political organisation she created, which has more than 6,000 clubs all around Italy.

Before entering politics she was a television journalist for Berlusconi's Mediaset group. She is the general executive manager of Trafilerie Brambilla spa, a steel manufacturing firm, and is president of two businesses with her father Vittorio: Sal Group spa and Sotra Coast International.

She rose quickly to national prominence in 2003 after having been named president of the under-40 entrepreneurs' council at Confcommercio. On 20 November 2006 she founded the Freedom Circles organisation and published the book titled Tutte le tasse di Prodi & C.: una finanziaria contro gli italiani.  She has worked very closely with Silvio Berlusconi, the president of the Forza Italia party.  Some observers (such as the magazine Panorama), name her as a possible successor to Berlusconi, as leader of the party and of the Italian centre-right. Brambilla has publicly denied such rumours.

In June 2007, through the Freedom Clubs organisation, Brambilla launched the satellite channel Freedom TV, featuring talks with experts, professionals and private citizens, often connected with her personal campaign against tax evasion.

Animal rights

Brambilla is a vegan and advocate of animal rights. She is the founder of the Italian League for the Defense of Animals and the Environment (LEIDAA).

In 2017, she formed the Animalist Movement, a political faction of Forza Italia to protect animal rights.

See also
 List of animal rights advocates

References

External links
 Official website of the Freedom Society
 

1967 births
21st-century Italian women
Italian animal rights activists
People from Lecco
Forza Italia (2013) politicians
Living people
Deputies of Legislature XVI of Italy
Deputies of Legislature XVII of Italy
Deputies of Legislature XVIII of Italy
Deputies of Legislature XIX of Italy
The People of Freedom politicians
Università Cattolica del Sacro Cuore alumni
Women government ministers of Italy
Women members of the Chamber of Deputies (Italy)